Roberto Gamarra is a Paraguayan centre forward who plays for Independiente FBC.

Career
Gamarra began his playing career with 3 de Febrero. He won three league championships with Club Libertad.

Honours
Libertad
Primera División Paraguaya (3): Clausura 2007, Apertura 2008, Clausura 2008

External links
Roberto Gamarra at BDFA.com.ar 

1981 births
Living people
Paraguayan footballers
Club Libertad footballers
Club Tacuary footballers
Club Nacional footballers
Club Atlético 3 de Febrero players
Sportivo Luqueño players
Cúcuta Deportivo footballers
O'Higgins F.C. footballers
Deportes Tolima footballers
Club Rubio Ñu footballers
Deportivo Santaní players
Independiente F.B.C. footballers
Club Sportivo San Lorenzo footballers
Paraguayan Primera División players
Chilean Primera División players
Categoría Primera A players
Expatriate footballers in Chile
Expatriate footballers in Colombia
Expatriate footballers in Bolivia
Association football forwards